Richard "Richie" Cardozo (born 28 March 1986 in Australia) is an Australian football (soccer) player who plays in the position of attacking midfielder or striker. He currently plays for Mt Druitt Town Rangers.

Early life
Cardozo was born in Sydney, Australia. He was born to his Uruguayan father and his Argentinian mother. He grew up speaking Spanish at home, and is also fluent in French and English. Cardozo has one older brother, former Socceroo Pablo Cardozo.

Playing career
Cardozo was selected for every representative team growing up; including New South Wales School Boys, New South Wales Under 14's, New South Wales Under 15's, and New South Wales Under 16's. He was also selected into the New South Wales Institute of Sport as a scholarship holder, and made the Under 16's and Under 17's Australian Team where he captained two games, won Top Goal Scorer for the World Cup Qualifiers, and represented Australia in the FIFA U-17 World Cup.

2003 and the NSL 
Richie made his NSL debut at 17 years old in 2003 for Sydney Olympic in the final season of the NSL before it became the A-League. At such a young age, Richie was earmarked by coaches and scouts to be the next big thing in Australian Football. However, with the collapse of the NSL, and the establishment of the new A-League, Cardozo's career was stalled, and he missed out on both a contract in the A-League, and the Under 20's World Cup in the Netherlands in 2005.

2007
After spells in the New South Wales Premier League, the Victorian Premier League, and the New Zealand National League, Cardozo signed a contract with Swiss third division team FC Bex in February 2007. After a stint that covered both the 06–07, and 07–08 seasons, he returned to Melbourne to play in the Victorian Premier League.

2008 – 2011
For the 2008 and 2009 season, Cardozo played for Richmond. He then moved to Hume City for the 2010 and 2011 season. Over the four years that he played in the Victorian Premier League, Carodozo scored 54 goals. In the 2011 Victorian Premier League season he was crowned top scorer in the league with 19 goals and won Media Player of the Year.

2012
In January 2012, he signed with Austrian Football First League club LASK. on a 2 and a half year deal. LASK Linz never lost a game with Cardozo playing that season, and a push for promotion to the Austrian Bundesliga fell slightly short. Unfortunately at the end of that season off field indiscretions by the club resulted in LASK being relegated to the 3rd tier of Austrian Football by the Austrian Federation, and Cardozo and LASK mutually terminated the remaining 2 years of his contract.

2013
In 2013, Cardozo returned to his home town of Sydney for the inaugural revamped National Premier League and played a major role in leading Rockdale City Suns to a Grand Final Birth. It was yet again a successful season for Cardozo, being selected in the starting 11 for the team of the year, and also netting 17 season goals to win the very first Golden boot for the NSW NPL and in doing so becoming the first and only player to win the Golden boot In both the NSW and VIctorian Premier Leagues.

2013/2014
In the Southern Summer, he returned to New Zealand and his former club in Waitakere United. Cardozo finished the season as the league's second top goalscorer.

2014
Hume City. Cardozo yet again linked up with a former team in Hume City for the 2014 season. It was a below par season for Cardozo by his standards, as he took over the captaincy of the side due to a long-term injury to the team's first choice skipper. Playing a different role and position within the team for most of the season, Cardozo found it more difficult to make his customary impact, scoring less goals than previous years. Frustration grew, rumours of a major contractual dispute and mis-management by the club surfaced for the third successive stint with Hume City. A tag that has haunted the organisation on many occasions for many years, and along with a desire to return to play professionally overseas again, ultimately led to the apparent reason for Cardozo's departure.

2016
In 2016, Cardozo joined Manly United in the NSW Premier League. Playing his first game of the season with Manly he scored a goal against Mounties Wanderers to advance Manly to the next round in the FFA cup. Cardozo ended his campaign with 10 goals in all competitions. Despite only playing half the season Cardozo finished as one of the league's leading goalscorers and helping Manly United to a Waratah cup final, FFA cup round of 32 and play off berth.

International career

Cardozo has represented Australia at U/17 level, and went to the FIFA U/17 World Championships in Finland 2003. He was the Top Goal Scorer in the Qualifying campaign and Captained the side on two occasions. He Narrowly missed out on selection for both the Australian U/20 team to compete in the 2005 World Youth Championships, and also the Olyroos that went to the Beijing Olympics 2008.

References

1986 births
Living people
Australian soccer players
Sydney Olympic FC players
Parramatta FC players
Waitakere United players
Sydney United 58 FC players
Hume City FC players
LASK players
Association football midfielders
New South Wales Institute of Sport alumni
Rockdale Ilinden FC players
FC Alashkert players